Strum is a surname, and may refer to:

 Bill Strum (1938–2010), American curler
 Charles Strum (1948–2021), American journalist
 Dana Strum (born 1958), American bass guitarist
 Gladys Strum (1906–2005), Canadian politician
 Hilde Strum (20th century), Austrian luger
 Louie Willard Strum (1890–1954), American lawyer
 Mike Strum (born 1963), American curler

See also
 Joe Strummer (1952–2002), British musician